This is a list of years in Eswatini.

20th century

21st century

See also
History of Eswatini

 
History of Eswatini
Eswatini
years